"Song Number 7" is a song recorded by American country music artist Randy Houser. It was released on March 28, 2016. It is the second single to Houser's fourth studio album, Fired Up, which was released March 11, 2016. The song was written by Justin Wilson, Ben Hayslip and Chris Janson.

Critical reception
Website Taste of Country reviewed the single with favor, praising the country rock instrumentation as well as Houser's vocal performance.

Chart performance

References

2016 songs
2016 singles
Randy Houser songs
BBR Music Group singles
Songs written by Ben Hayslip
Songs written by Chris Janson